Vladimir Tsvetkov (born 2 November 1980) is a former ice dancer. He teamed up with Miriam Steinel in November 1997 and competed with her for Germany until 2003. They are two-time Junior Grand Prix Final bronze medalists.

Programs 
(with Steinel)

Results 
(with Steinel)

References

External links
 

1980 births
Living people
Russian male ice dancers
German male ice dancers
Figure skaters from Moscow